Ruth Jones is a British actress and writer.

Ruth Jones may also refer to:

People
Ruth Lee Jones or Dinah Washington (1924–1963), American actress and singer
Ruth Gordon Jones (1896–1985), American actress
Ruth Jones (basketball) (1946–1986), American college women's basketball coach
Ruth Jones (politician) (born 1962), Labour MP for Newport West
Ruth Jones McClendon (1943–2017; born Ruth Elizabeth Jones), American politician
Ruth Jones Graves Wakefield (1903–1977), inventor of the chocolate chip cookie
Ruth Martin-Jones (born 1947), British heptathlete

Fictional characters
Ruth Jones, a character in Rising Damp
Ruth Gordon Jones, a character in The Actress

See also

 Jones (disambiguation)
 Ruth (disambiguation)